Kotalpur is a  village in the Daspur I CD block in the Ghatal subdivision of the Paschim Medinipur district in the state of West Bengal, India.

Geography

Location

Area overview
Ishwar Chandra Vidyasagar, scholar, social reformer and a key figure of the Bengal Renaissance, was born at Birsingha on 26 September 1820.

Ghatal subdivision, shown in the map alongside, has alluvial soils. Around 85% of the total cultivated area is cropped more than once. Its population density is 1,099 per km2, but being a small subdivision only a little over a fifth of the people in the district reside in this subdivision. 14.33% of the population lives in urban areas and 86.67% lives in the rural areas.

Note: The map alongside presents some of the notable locations in the subdivision. All places marked in the map are linked in the larger full screen map.

Demographics
According to the 2011 Census of India, Kotalpur had a total population of 1,342, of which 664 (49%) were males and 678 (51%) were females. There were 170 persons in the age range of 0–6 years. The total number of literate persons in Kotalpur was 1,084 (92.49% of the population over 6 years).

Kotalpur picture gallery

References

External links

Villages in Paschim Medinipur district